Clarence G. Galston (April 18, 1876 – January 22, 1964) was a United States district judge of the United States District Court for the Eastern District of New York.

Education and career

Born in New York City, New York, Galston received a Bachelor of Science degree from the City College of New York in 1895, a Bachelor of Laws from the New York University School of Law in 1899 and an Artium Magister degree from New York University in 1900. He was in private practice in New York City from 1899 to 1929, and was special counsel on patent matters for the City of New York from 1912 to 1929. He was President of Woodmere Academy in Woodmere, New York from 1914 to 1929.

Federal judicial service

Galston was nominated by President Herbert Hoover on April 18, 1929, to the United States District Court for the Eastern District of New York, to a new seat authorized by 45 Stat. 1409. He was confirmed by the United States Senate on April 29, 1929, and received his commission the same day. He assumed senior status on January 1, 1957. His service terminated on January 22, 1964, due to his death in Woodmere. He was interred in Mount Neboh Cemetery in Glendale, Queens, New York.

Memoirs

Galston wrote a memoir of his judicial service, Behind the Judicial Curtain, published in 1959.

References

Sources
 
 

1876 births
1964 deaths
Lawyers from New York City
New York University School of Law alumni
Judges of the United States District Court for the Eastern District of New York
United States district court judges appointed by Herbert Hoover
20th-century American judges
People from Woodmere, New York